Megara is an ancient Greek city in the region of Megaris in west Attica.

Megara may also refer to:

 Megara (wife of Heracles), a mythological Greek princess
 Megara (Disney character), a fictional character from the 1997 Disney animated film, Hercules
 Megara (Thessaly), a town in ancient Thessaly, Greece
 Megara Gulf, in the northern part of the Saronic Gulf of the Aegean Sea
 Megara Hyblaea, an ancient Greek colony in Sicily, near Augusta

See also
 Mağara (disambiguation)
 Mega (disambiguation)
 Megaera (disambiguation)